Curtis Halladay (born February 14, 1995) is a Canadian adaptive rower who competes in international elite events. He is a Paralympic bronze medalist and a World bronze medalist in the mixed coxed four.

References

External links
 
 

1995 births
Living people
Canadian male rowers
Paralympic rowers of Canada
Rowers at the 2016 Summer Paralympics
Sportspeople from Greater Sudbury
Medalists at the 2016 Summer Paralympics
Canadian cinematographers